The Chile women's national basketball team is administered by the Federación de Basquetbol de Chile.

Competitions

Olympic Games

World Championship

Americas Championship

Pan American Games

Head coaches
  Mario Negron 2016
  Andrea Bilbao 2018-present

See also
 Chile women's national under-17 basketball team
 Chile men's national basketball team

References

External links
 Chile at FIBA Americas 

 
Women's national basketball teams in South America
National team